= The Economy of Ethnic Cleansing =

Book by David Gerlach

- First edition
- Author: David Gerlach
- Genre: History
- Publisher: Cambridge University Press
- Publication date: 2017

The Economy of Ethnic Cleansing: The Transformation of the German-Czech Borderlands after World War II (2017) is a book by David Gerlach about the expulsion of Germans from Czechoslovakia and colonization efforts in the Sudetenland, the German-majority area.
